The International Human Rights Tribunal (IHRT) was a symbolic tribunal which took place in Vienna, Austria, in June 1995. It was chaired by environmental and human rights activist Freda Meissner-Blau and Gerhard Oberschlick, editor of FORVM, and was dedicated to the persecution of lesbians, gays, bisexuals and transgender persons in Austria from 1945 to 1995.

International committee
As the organizers feared repressions by the Republic of Austria, they asked prominent figures from the international human rights community to join the International Committee and thus protect the endeavour. Amongst the members were Jacques Gaillot, bishop of Partenia, politicians Mel Read (UK), Svend Robinson (Canada), Claudia Roth (Germany) and Terezija Stoisits (Austria), writers Kuno Knöbl, Christine Nöstlinger and Gerhard Roth, developmentalist Robert Chambers (Frankfurt), sociologist Bernd Marin and human rights lawyer Manfred Nowak (both Vienna), political scientist Anton Pelinka (Innsbruck), as well as other academic scholars like Igor S. Kon (Moscow), Asa G. Rachmanova (Saint Petersburg), Douglas Sanders (Vancouver), Theo Sandfort (Utrecht) and Christopher Williams (Preston, UK), as well as human rights activists, publicists and LGBT activists from Belgium, Denmark, France, Netherlands, Norway and Peru.

Senate
The composition of the jury changed in each of the seven parts of the tribunal – according to the specific expertise of the jurors. For example, the jury for VII. Discrimination in the general public consisted of four journalists, an editor, a sociologist, writer Haslinger, theologian Lüthi, actress Echerer and psychotherapist Perner.

Prosecution
Human rights activist Christian Michelides served as attorney-general.

The prosecution brought forward charges in seven different fields:
 Penal Code and constitution
 Civil registry, family, marriage, domestic partnership
 Reparations for Nazi repression
 AIDS and the social consequences
 Prison, psychiatry, armed services, police, right of asylum
 Discrimination in the working environment
 Discrimination in the general public
Testimonies were brought up to document the charges. They reported about police persecution, imprisonment, psychiatric treatment and electroshock therapies, loss of jobs and public humiliation.

In each case the Republic of Austria was charged with neglecting its human rights obligations and therefore broken its own commitment to the Universal Declaration of Human Rights adopted by the United Nations General Assembly in Paris in 1948.

Defence
In six of the seven parts of the tribunal the defence bench remained empty. The Republic of Austria refused to defend itself. Most of the political representatives had either ignored the invitation or passed it on to some department of their own ministry which never replied. Only one lengthy letter from Roland Miklau, departmental head in the Ministry of Justice, explained why he preferred not to participate.

On the first day of the tribunal, MP , member of the ruling Social Democratic Party, sat on the defence bench as amicus curiae, not defending the republic, but rather stating that he agreed with all the changes in the penal code demanded. He referred to the refusal of coalition partner Austrian People's Party which was effectively blocking every move in this field.

Seven verdicts
The Republic of Austria was found guilty in all seven fields. However, the jury did not always agree completely with the demands of the prosecution team. For example, in part I. Penal code and constitution the attorney-general requested the abolition of the pornography law. The jury did not agree on this demand.

References

1995 in Austria
Human rights organisations based in Austria
Human rights in Austria
LGBT rights
Transgender rights